Acianthera fabiobarrosii is a species of orchid.

References

fabiobarrosii